Julije Bauer (9 October 1908 – March 1945) was a Yugoslav sprinter. He competed in the men's 100 metres at the 1936 Summer Olympics. He was killed in action during World War II.

Competition record

References

1908 births
1945 deaths
Athletes (track and field) at the 1936 Summer Olympics
Yugoslav male sprinters
Serbian male sprinters
Olympic athletes of Yugoslavia
Sportspeople from Pančevo
Yugoslav military personnel killed in World War II